Numbers is an upcoming South Korean television series starring Kim Myung-soo and Choi Jin-hyuk. It is scheduled for release on MBC TV in the first half of 2023.

Synopsis
Numbers tells the various stories that unfold within an accounting firm. It revolves around an accountant with a high school diploma, who fights against injustice.

Cast

Main
 Kim Myung-soo as Jang Ho-woo: the first and only high school-educated accountant to join the Taeil Accounting Firm, one of the nation's four big accounting firms.
 Choi Jin-hyuk as Han Seung-jo: an accountant who is the only son of the vice president of Taeil Accounting Firm.

Supporting
 Choi Min-soo as Han Je-gyun: Seung-jo's father who is the vice president of Taeil Accounting Firm.
 Yeonwoo as Jin Yeon-ah: a senior assistant at Taeil Accounting Firm.
 Lee Sung-yeol as Shim Hyung-woo: the ambitious deals director of Taeil Accounting Firm.
 Kim Sun-bin as Gong Hee-sam: Ho-woo's childhood friend and current housemate.
 Do Yeon-jin as Song Yeo-jin: a police officer.
 Kim Young-jae as Kang Hyun: a senior manager.
 Bae Hae-sun as Ahn Seung-yeon: vice president of the audit department at Taeil Accounting Firm.
 Choi Jeong-woo as Yang Jae-hwan: manager of the deal department at Taeil Accounting Firm.

Production
The series was tentatively titled Accounting Firm.

References

External links

 
 

Korean-language television shows
MBC TV television dramas
South Korean workplace television series
2023 South Korean television series debuts

Upcoming television series